Running Girl is a mini-album by Ooberman, released in October 2001 on the band's own Rotodisc label. A single of the title track was released in November 2001. The title track was also featured in slightly remixed form on the band's Hey Petrunko album.

Aside from "The Kitchen Fire" (co-written by Dan Popplewell and Sophia Churney) all the tracks on the album were written singly by either singer Dan Popplewell or guitarist Andy Flett. This was a marked departure from the collaborative nature of their earlier work.

March Records released the album in the USA with two bonus tracks - earlier single "Dolphin Blue" and a remix of the title track. A version of the album was released in Japan by Rotodisc with the bonus track "Behind My Shield".

Track listing
 "Running Girl" (Popplewell)
 "Flashing Light At Sunset" (Flett)
 "We'll Know When We Get There" (Flett)
 "Blink Of An Eye" (Popplewell)
 "Here Come The Ice Wolves" (Popplewell)
 "Ghosts" (Popplewell)
 "The Kitchen Fire" (Popplewell/Churney)
 "Follow The Sun" (Popplewell)
 "Alone At Last" (Flett)

Running Girl single

The title track was released as a single on 5 November 2001, on limited edition white 7" vinyl. The b-side was a remix of the track by Phantom 309 (aka Ooberman bassist Steve Flett). This remix was also featured on the March Records release of the album.

2001 albums
Ooberman albums